The Diocese of Sheffield is an administrative division of the Church of England, part of the Province of York.

The Diocese of Sheffield was created under George V on 23 January 1914, by the division from the Diocese of York (along with that part of the Diocese of Southwell in the city of Sheffield). It covers most of the County of South Yorkshire (except Barnsley), with a small part of the East Riding of Yorkshire, one parish in North Yorkshire and one in North Lincolnshire – an area of almost .  It is headed by the Bishop of Sheffield and its Cathedral is Sheffield Cathedral.
The diocese is linked with the Diocese of Argentina. Since 1990 it has been linked with the Evangelical Church in Germany's Hattingen-Witten District in Westphalia.

Organisation

Bishops
The diocesan Bishop of Sheffield (Pete Wilcox) is the ordinary of the diocese and is assisted throughout the diocese by a Bishop suffragan of Doncaster (currently vacant; bishop-designate: Sophie Jelley). Alternative episcopal oversight (for parishes in the diocese who reject the ministry of priests who are women) is provided by the provincial episcopal visitor (PEV) the Bishop suffragan of Beverley, Glyn Webster. He is licensed as an honorary assistant bishop of the diocese in order to facilitate his work there. Besides Webster, David Hawtin, former Bishop suffragan of Repton has lived in Greenhill since 2007 and is licensed as an honorary assistant bishop.

Archdeaconries and deaneries 
The Diocese is subdivided into twelve deaneries, split between two archdeaconries:

*including Cathedral

List of churches

Outside deanery structures

Deanery of Adwick-le-Street

Deanery of Doncaster

Deanery of West Doncaster 

1in Crockfords this church is part of the Adwick-le-Street deanery

Deanery of Snaith and Hatfield

Deanery of Tankersley

Deanery of Wath

Deanery of Attercliffe 

1in Crockfords these churches are placed in Ecclesall Deanery

Deanery of Ecclesall 

1these four clergy are also licensed as curates in each other's benefices

Deanery of Ecclesfield
Website: www.ecclesfielddeanery.co.uk

Deanery of Hallam 

1these clergy are also licensed as curates in each other's benefices

Deanery of Laughton

Deanery of Rotherham

References

Bibliography
Church of England Statistics 2002

External links 
The diocese's home page

 
Christian organizations established in 1914
Dioceses established in the 20th century
Sheffield